Raúl Enrique Gorriti Drago (10 October 1956 – 2 April 2015) was a professional football  midfielder from Peru. He competed for the Peru national football team at the 1978 FIFA World Cup and obtained a total number of 11 caps for his native country, scoring one goal, in the years 1976 to 1979.

See also
1978 FIFA World Cup squads

References

External links

 Weltfussbol profile

1956 births
2015 deaths
Association football midfielders
Peruvian footballers
Peru international footballers
1978 FIFA World Cup players
Sporting Cristal footballers
León de Huánuco footballers
Deportivo Municipal footballers
Peruvian Primera División players
Expatriate footballers in Chile
Expatriate footballers in Argentina